Pune Metro is a mass rapid transit system serving the city of Pune, India. The  Purple line from PCMC Bhavan to Swargate runs on an elevated viaduct between PCMC Bhavan to Range Hills, from where it goes underground. The  elevated Line 3 will run from the Rajiv Gandhi Infotech Park in Hinjawadi via Balewadi to Civil Court. All three lines will align at the Civil Court interchange station.

The foundation stone for the Purple and Aqua lines was laid by the Prime Minister of India in December 2016. Sections of the purple and aqua lines became operational in March 2022. Line 3 is being implemented by the Pune Metropolitan Region Development Authority (PMRDA) and the joint venture between Tata Realty  and Siemens on a Public–Private Partnership basis. On 18 December 2018, the prime minister laid the foundation stone for Line 3. However, due to delays in land acquisition, construction on Line 3 could only commence in November 2021.

Background
Pune has witnessed enormous industrial growth since 1990s. Rapid urbanisation in the recent past has put the city's travel infrastructure to stress. With an increase in small scale, medium scale as well as heavy industries, the traffic in the city is rising at alarming rates. The roads in the city, cater to various kinds of vehicles simultaneously. Such roads, at an optimum can carry 8,000 peak hour peak direction traffic (PHPDT). Being a densely populated area, Pune's traffic needs cannot be met by road-based system and additional flyovers. Pune Mahanagar Parivahan Mahamandal Ltd. (PMPML), the public transport provider that operates buses and BRT services in Pune has failed to meet the transport needs. This has mainly contributed to an unhealthy growth of vehicles on roads. According to reports published in April 2018, the number of vehicles registered in the city stands at 3.62 million surpassing the population of the city. Such a high density of traffic has put the urban transport system in Pune under severe stress leading to longer travel time, increased air pollution and rise in number of road accidents. In light of this, a strong public transport system has been discussed in Pune since the early 2000s. Initially, Skybus Metro, a prototype suspended railway system developed by the Konkan Railways, was being considered on a  route between Swargate and Pune Railway Station. However, following a tragic mishap in September 2004, the project took a back seat.

On 15 August 2008, the preparation of Detailed Project Report (DPR) work was undertaken by the Delhi Metro Rail Corporation (DMRC) and submitted their report. In 2010, the Pune Municipal Corporation (PMC) delayed submitting the proposal to the Union government to make provisions in the annual budget for the project. However, it received the final approval from the Central Government only on 7 December 2016, almost 4.5 years later. PM Narendra Modi laid the foundation stone on 24 December 2016. MahaMetro is implementing the two lines, viz. the partly elevated and partly underground Purple line from Pimpri & Chinchwad to Swargate and the completely elevated Aqua line from Vanaz to Ramwadi. MahaMetro expects to complete the project in 2021. Days after the foundation stone for the MahaMetro lines was laid, PMRDA approved Line 3 (Hinjawadi Phase-I, II, III - Shivajinagar) on 29 December 2016. The project will be implemented by PMRDA on a PPP basis. It was approved by the State on 2 January 2018 and by the Centre on 7 March 2018.

Network

MahaMetro and PMRDA
The Pune Metropolitan Region Development Authority (PMRDA) had proposed to take over the Metro project, which was declined by the PMC and PCMC. The opposing representatives said that the Metro rail is going to be implemented by Special Purpose Vehicle. Instead, the civic bodies suggested inclusion of PMRDA in the SPV to increase the reach of the Metro rail. PMRDA will execute only Line 3 i.e. Shivajinagar to Hinjawadi (Phase-I, II, III) line. They will follow PPP model for the project. For the implementation of the initial two lines, the former Nagpur Metro Rail Corporation was reconstituted to form Maharashtra Metro Rail Corporation Limited (MahaMetro).

Operational network

MahaMetro lines

Purple Line (PCMC Bhavan – Swargate) 
 
Purple Line runs from PCMC Bhavan in Pimpri to Swargate. The  line is elevated till Range Hills with 9 stations and goes underground up to Swargate with 5 stations. This route runs via Nashik Phata, Khadki and Shivajinagar. The maintenance depot for this line will be located near the Range Hills station on the land acquired from the College of Agriculture. Agriculture college to Budhwar Peth; 2. Budhwar Peth to Swargate. Mahametro has invited separate tenders for these two packages each involving the design and construction of the stations and associated tunnels. Following firms have submitted the bids: L&T, Tata projects-Gulermark JV, Shanghai Tunnel Engineering, J Kumar, Afcons. The underground station at Swargate will be a part of a multimodal transit hub integrating intra- and inter-city bus services run by PMPML and MSRTC, autorickshaws, as well as parking facility for private vehicles. In August 2018, J Kumar Infraprojects was awarded the contract for the hub. In April 2018, MahaMetro began construction in the Kharalwadi and Morwadi area on the elevated stretch of the line between PCMC Bhavan and Range Hills. For the construction, the barricades on the newly built BRTS lane were removed. MahaMetro claimed it to be temporary and revealed that an earlier plan to construct the pillars on the footpath was dropped due to utility lines running below the surface. However, the PCMC conducted trials on the BRTS route in April 2018 and intended to launch services soon and therefore ordered MahaMetro to stop construction. As a result, MahaMetro revised the alignment in May 2018, one year after construction began on the line. 
Ever since the Centre gave its nod for the first two metro corridors, there has been a demand for extending the Purple line from PCMC Bhavan to Bhakti Shakti Chowk, Nigdi. In light of these demands, PCMC decided to prepare DPRs for the extensions in their respective jurisdictions and bear the cost for it. However, on 18 January 2018, MLA and Pune's Guardian Minister Girish Bapat announced in his speech at the ground-breaking ceremony for the first metro station at Sant Tukaram Nagar that work on the extension would be taken up only in the "second phase" of the project without mentioning a timeline. As a result, confusion ensued and social organizations in Pimpri, Chinchwad, Akurdi held a token hunger strike in February 2018 to press their demand for extension. In April 2018, PCMC earmarked a sum of  so that MahaMetro could prepare a DPR for the Nigdi extension. The DPR was approved by the state in February 2021 and is awaiting the nod from the centre. There have also been demands for extending the line from Swargate to Katraj. The extension is planned to be entirely underground and will have 3 stations at Gultekdi market yard, Padmavati and Katraj. The extension is expected to cost .

Aqua Line (Vanaz - Ramwadi) 
Aqua line runs from Ramwadi to Vanaz via Mangalwar Peth and Deccan Gymkhana. The line is so named because a section of it passes through the Mula-Mutha river bed. It connects with the Purple line and Line 3 at the Civil Court interchange station. The maintenance depot for the Aqua line is located near the Vanaz station on the former garbage depot land. In November 2015, a revised proposal submitted to the PMC by the DMRC suggested realigning the route along the Mutha river as against the earlier alignment along the Jangali Maharaj Road, Pune to reduce the project cost. The alignment of Line 2 was once again revised in January 2018 due to Indian Railways' expansion plans. In September 2018, the National Monument Authority rejected permission sought by MahaMetro to build near Aga Khan Palace in the prohibited area of the monument. No construction is permitted within  of a monument under AMASR Act, 1958. This led to a third revision in the alignment of line 2, for which MahaMetro has suggested the PMC three alternative alignments for the Civil Court to Ramwadi section near the monument. The decision came in February 2018, when a longstanding dispute over the erstwhile garbage depot land in Kothrud was resolved by allotting it to MahaMetro for the development of a metro depot. A permanent exhibition depicting the life of Shivaji - the Shivsrushti (Marathi: शिवसृष्टी) project - which was also planned at the same location, will instead be built on the land reserved for a biodiversity park near Chandani Chowk. The station at Chandani Chowk will bear the name of the Shivsrushti project. MahaMetro will bear the costs for this extension. There have been demands for the extension of the line from Ramwadi to Wagholi as well as a connection to the Pune International Airport.

Rolling Stock 
The purple and aqua line of the Pune Metro use standard gauge rolling stock manufactured by Titagarh Firema. Each coach has a capacity of 320 passengers with longitudinal seating for 44 passengers. The trains are fully air-conditioned and feature CCTV, panic buttons, emergency doors, public address systems and audio-visual systems for indicating opening and closing of doors. One coach in each train is reserved for women and there are dedicated spaces for passengers in wheelchairs.

Cost 
The PMC and PCMC will each bear 5% of the cost, while the state government and the central government will each bear 20% of the cost. The remaining 50% will be obtained as loans. The state government's share of 20% includes the expenses of acquiring land, including government land, at market price. The delay in the execution of the project has resulted in an upward revision of ₹ 700 crores (US$107.8 million) in the draft civic budget for 2015-16 presented by Municipal Commissioner Kunal Kumar.

Fares 
An integrated fare system has also been planned to facilitate seamless transfers, however, exact fares for the same travel distance will vary based on the operator. MiCard (Marathi: मी कार्ड), the smart card currently being used on the bus and BRTS services run by the PMPML, will be used as the common mobility card on the metro services as well as parking facilities.

Puneri Metro - Pune Metro Line 3

Line 3 Hinjawadi – Civil Court 

Line 3 aka Puneri Metro is under construction and will run from Civil Court, Pune to Megapolis Pune (including Maan and Bhoirwadi) in Hinjawadi. The 23.3-km line will be completely elevated and will have 23 stations and will align with the MahaMetro lines at the Civil Court interchange station. The construction will be taken up in three phases, the section between Hinjawadi and Balewadi is expected to be taken up first followed by the section between Balewadi and Civil Court, Shivajinagar. A metro car shed will be built in Maan, Hinjawadi. The MIDC will provide 55 acres of land in Hinjawadi for setting up a Metro rail depot. The line will also connect to the multimodal transit hub planned along the National Highway 48 in Balewadi which will integrate the inter- and intra-city bus services and BRTS operated by the MSRTC and PMPML. The hub will be constructed on a PPP basis under the Smart City mission and is expected to cost . The hub will comprise a built-up space of  including  of commercial office space, parking space for 80 buses, 1942 cars and 3884 two-wheelers. As of October 2018, offers from international and national real estate developers have been invited for the hub and the PMC is in the process of land transfer to the executing agency, Pune Smart City Development Corporation Ltd. (PSCDCL). PMRDA has announced that the line would be extended from the Civil Court intersection up to Phursungi IT Park via Hadapsar. The DPR for the extension is being prepared by DMRC. This would add another 11.8 km of elevated corridor to the network and 12 additional stations.

Cost 
The line is estimated to cost  and will be implemented by PMRDA on a PPP basis. The private partner will bring in 60% of the funds, 30% in equity and 70% in debt, while the rest 40% will be provided together by the Centre, State and PMRDA. The private partner will build, operate and maintain the line for 35 years. This land located in Balewadi will be monetized by the bidder for financial viability and forms a part of the costs to be borne by the State.

Expansion

Phase 2
Pune Metro has started the preparation for the second phase of the metro

Proposed lines
The following routes have been proposed:

 Ramwadi - Wagholi -Shikrapur
 Civil Court - Hadapsar- Uruli Kanchan
 Swargate Interchange - Hadapsar
 Kharadi - Khadakwasla-Sinhgad Paaytha
 Hadapsar- Saswad - CSMIA/Jejuri Purandar, Pune
Wakad - Nashik Phata - Chakan
Chandni Chowk - Pirangut
Pirangut - Hinjawadi
Swargate - Khadi Machine Chowk
University of Pune - Nal Stop- Warje - Khadakwasla

Issues

Delay in Implementation 
The citizens and city based NGOs have regularly raised questions over the intention of the state governments as to whether they actually want to implement the project. The project was proposed way back in 2007 by the Chief Ministers of Maharashtra, but did not move ahead due to many reasons. The DPR was itself approved only on 12 June 2012. At an event in 2013 during his tour of the city, the Metroman E. Sreedharan blamed the people involved in planning and implementing the project for the long delay, stating that "Pune lost five valuable years in unnecessary discussions instead of executing the project."

Alignment Issue
Initial plans were to build a few sections underground and the rest elevated. However, citizens of Pune did not want elevated routes as they felt that the roads could not bear the increased traffic that would result from the construction. Most roads were too narrow to accommodate the pillars of elevated routes. It was decided that all the routes in the city would be underground, although the map and the details of phases showed elevated routes. In November 2011, the state government declared that all the routes would be underground. However, in April 2012, the PMC declared that all routes will be as per the DMRC report, mostly elevated and partially underground in core city areas. On 27 May 2015, the then Minister of Housing and Urban Affairs stated that underground metro was not a feasible option and that Pune, like other cities, will have to get an elevated metro as suggested by the DMRC. But as per the city activists, elevated metro is not possible due to presence of some flyovers along the route of metro and narrow roads on the metro corridor, which will cause traffic congestion and interruption. To alleviate the confusion, Chief Ministers of Maharashtra announced that Pune will get "mixed-metro", as the alignment of some routes does support elevated sections.

Metro phase I was criticized by Pimpri Chinchwad Citizens Forum, Pune (PCCF), believing that the project will not benefit nearly 70 per cent area of PCMC Administration, as it will not serve the Akurdi, Chinchwad and Nigdi stretch. Adding further, the citizens group supported their cause by stating that it would take another 5 years after phase II gets approval from Union Cabinet for metro to reach core PCMC administered areas. Since infrastructure projects take a lot of time to get approvals, they fear metro will not reach Nigdi before 2025. Many architects and urban planners also vouch for Nigdi's role in transport management.

Environment Interest Litigation 
In May 2016, an environment interest litigation (EIL) was filed in the western zone bench of the National Green Tribunal (NGT) against the realignment of Line 2 from Jangali Maharaj Road to the Mutha River bed. The litigants MP Anu Aga, Sarang Yadwadkar, Arti Kirloskar and Dileep Padgaonkar expressed concerns over free flow of the river being obstructed by the pillars supporting the 1.7-km stretch of the metro viaduct. In October 2016, the Biodiversity Monitoring Committee of the PMC reported that the metro project could be catastrophic for the riverbed ecology, corroborating the EIL. The NGT put an interim stay on metro construction in the river bed on 2 January 2017, days after the foundation stone was laid on 24 December 2016. The stay, however, was put on hold by the Supreme Court. Subsequently, after the MahaMetro was formed and became a respondent in the EIL, it unsuccessfully moved the Supreme Court challenging the NGT's jurisdiction on the case. In October 2017, the NGT resumed the hearing and appointed an expert committee convened by the National Environmental Engineering Research Institute (NEERI) to study the impact of the metro project on the river bed. In January 2018, the report was submitted and stated that the construction would not damage the river. However, the case is still pending in the NGT. Since 1 February 2018, the NGT's western zone bench in Pune is unable to function following a Supreme Court order restricting single-member benches of the NGT from hearing cases. The case is expected to be heard in July 2018, when the circuit bench of the NGT will hear cases for three weeks in Pune. On 3 August 2018, the principal bench of the NGT cleared metro construction on the river bed. The clearance is subject to MahaMetro complying with the recommendations made by the three-member expert committee, which had concluded that the construction would not damage riverbed hydrology.

FSI Debate
The DMRC had proposed 4 FSI on either side of the corridor to achieve greater population densification through vertical development of residential and commercial properties. The PMC will raise money for the metro and needed civic amenities to support the higher density. Furthermore, PMC hopes to increase the use of metro.

Some members of the planning committee have suggested that three FSI be granted not only within a 500-m radius along the metro corridor but also in the entire city. Members have suggested that the amount collected through the premium on additional FSI should be turned into an urban development fund. A 60% share of this fund should be used for the metro project, while 15% for the PMPML and high capacity mass transit road and monorail and 25% for developing basic infrastructure.

But as per several urban planners, NGOs and experts, the FSI introduction will have more drawbacks than benefits for the city.

Even if half of the landowners along the metro corridor take advantage of the 4 FSI proposal, it will lead to 20 km2 of built up area in coming years, which is more than the total housing needs of Pune for the next 20 years.
The PMC would raise  from the sale of FSI whereas it needs just .
In the area studied, most of the plots which could consume the 4 FSI were at the edge of the corridor away from the stations, while many plots next to the tracks and the stations would remain as they are, since they are too small to accommodate the extra FSI. This plan might backfire as the distance of these plots from the nearby metro corridor might encourage the residents to use private vehicles and thus, defeat the purpose of metro.
Given the prevailing land costs, the new development that comes up will be of the "premium" category. Thus any new housing that comes up through this extra FSI will cater to the more affluent segment, which is the group least likely to use the Metro.
The open space per capita in the city will be reduced to half or less of what it is at present. The space required for other public amenities like hospitals, schools, clinics etc. will also fall short since very few plots are large enough to come under the "amenity" space rules under which the landowners have to give small portion to the city for providing amenities.

In July 2018, the Department of Defence of the MoD notified height restrictions in a six-kilometer radius of the National Defence Academy and the Lohegaon airport. This area accounts for approximately 50% of the city's area. The notification restricts the construction of high-rise buildings and has made 4 FSI along the metro corridor under the transit-oriented development policy impossible.

Network map

See also
 Urban rail transit in India
 Pune Suburban Railway
 Pune Monorail
 Greater Nashik Metro
 Mumbai Metro
 Nagpur Metro
 Navi Mumbai Metro
 Thane Metro
 Transport in Pune
 Pune Mahanagar Parivahan Mahamandal Limited

References

External links

 Pune metro official site
 Pune Metro Project
 News release identifying routes
 Delhi Metro Rail Corporation
 DMRC Tender for Environmental Assessment Study
 Times of India article on project update in July 2008
 wheels roll for Vanaz – Ramwadi metro corridor
 nod for Vanaz – Ramwadi Metro root
 pune-metro-full-presentation
 

 
Transport in Pimpri-Chinchwad
Proposed rapid transit in India
Transport in Pune
Airport rail links in India
Planned transport for Pune
Standard gauge railways in India
25 kV AC railway electrification